Rauno Sappinen (born 23 January 1996) is an Estonian professional footballer who plays as a forward for Ekstraklasa side Stal Mielec, on loan from Piast Gliwice, and the Estonia national team.

Club career

Flora
Sappinen came through the youth system at Flora and made his debut in the Meistriliiga on 2 March 2013, in a 4–1 home win over Tallinna Kalev. He won his first Meistriliiga title in the 2015 season. Sappinen's performances in 2015 also saw him voted Estonian Young Footballer of the Year. He was Flora's top goalscorer in the league for three consecutive seasons from 2015 to 2017, and joint top scorer in the Meistriliiga in 2017, alongside Albert Prosa. Sappinen won his second Meistriliiga title in the 2017 season, and was named Meistriliiga Player of the Year.

Loan to Beerschot Wilrijk
On 31 January 2018, Sappinen joined Belgian club Beerschot Wilrijk on loan until the end of the season. He made his debut for the club on 9 February 2018, in a 0–0 home draw against Westerlo.

Loan to Den Bosch
On 13 August 2018, Sappinen joined Dutch club Den Bosch on loan until the end of the season. He made his debut in the Eerste Divisie on 17 August 2018, and scored the winning goal in a 2–1 away victory over Volendam.

Loan to Domžale
On 14 August 2019, Sappinen penned a three-year loan deal with Slovenian club Domžale.

Return to Flora
On 6 July 2021, Sappinen scored both goals in Flora's win over Hibernians in the first leg of their UEFA Champions League first qualifying round match. He would score again in the second leg a week later as Flora won 5–0 on aggregate and progressed to the second qualifying round for just the third time in club history.

Piast Gliwice
On 22 December 2021, Sappinen signed a three-and-a-half-year contract with Polish Ekstraklasa club Piast Gliwice, effective from 1 February 2022.

On 24 January 2023, Sappinen joined Stal Mielec on loan until the end of the season with an option to buy.

International career
Sappinen began his international career for Estonia in 2011 with the under-16 national team, and has captained the under-19 and under-21 national sides.

Sappinen made his senior international debut for Estonia on 11 November 2015, in a 3–0 home victory over Georgia in a friendly. He scored his first international goal on 19 November 2016, in a 1–1 away draw against Saint Kitts and Nevis in a friendly.

Career statistics

Club

International

Scores and results list Estonia's goal tally first, score column indicates score after each Sappinen goal.

Honours
Flora
Meistriliiga: 2015, 2017, 2020
Estonian Cup: 2012–13, 2015–16
Estonian Supercup: 2014, 2016, 2021

Individual
Estonian Footballer of the Year: 2020
Estonian Young Footballer of the Year: 2015, 2018
Meistriliiga Player of the Year: 2017
Meistriliiga top scorer: 2017
Meistriliiga Fans Player of the Year: 2015, 2017

References

External links

Rauno Sappinen – UEFA competition record

1996 births
Living people
Estonian footballers
Association football forwards
Footballers from Tallinn
Esiliiga players
Meistriliiga players
FC Flora players
Challenger Pro League players
K Beerschot VA players
Eerste Divisie players
FC Den Bosch players
Slovenian PrvaLiga players
NK Domžale players
Ekstraklasa players
Piast Gliwice players
Stal Mielec players
Estonia youth international footballers
Estonia under-21 international footballers
Estonia international footballers
Estonian expatriate footballers
Estonian expatriate sportspeople in Belgium
Expatriate footballers in Belgium
Estonian expatriate sportspeople in the Netherlands
Expatriate footballers in the Netherlands
Estonian expatriate sportspeople in Slovenia
Expatriate footballers in Slovenia
Estonian expatriate sportspeople in Poland
Expatriate footballers in Poland
Estonian people of Finnish descent